Letters from Turkey are actually memoirs written by Europeans who had been to  Ottoman Empire. Usually, the series of letters had been collected and published later on with various titles. But they are popularly known as "Letters from Turkey" or "Turkish letters". Below is the summary of these.

Letters by Busbecq 

Ogier Ghiselin de Busbecq (1522-1592) was a diplomat in the Holy Roman Empire. He was sent to the Ottoman Empire to discuss the disputed territory of Transylvania (modern west Romania) in 1554. During his stay his addresses were Rüstem Pasha and Semiz Ali Pasha both of which were grand viziers. Upon returning to his country he published the letters he had written to his colleague Nicholas Michault under the title Turcicae epistolae. Busbuecq is also known for his introduction of tulip, from Turkish flora to Europe.

Letters by Montagu 

Lady Mary Wortley Montagu (1689-1762) was the wife of Edward Wortley Montagu, the British ambassador to Ottoman Empire between 1716-1718. The letters about  her travels and observations about Ottoman life was published under the title Turkish Embassy Letters. One of her important observations was the  primitive form of smallpox vaccination.

Letters by Mikes 

Kelemen Mikes (1690–1761) was a Hungarian essayist, noted for his rebellious activities against the Habsburg monarchy. Although backed by Ottoman Empire, Hungarian rebels were defeated and Mikes had to choose a life in exile. After 1715, Mikes spent the rest  of his life in Tekirdağ, a city near to İstanbul (also known as Constantinople). His work is known as Letters from Turkey.

Letters by Moltke 

Helmuth von Moltke the Elder (1800-1891) was an officier in Prussian army. He spent four years in the Ottoman Empire as a military advisor between 1835-1839. Upon returning to Germany, he published Letters on Conditions and Events in Turkey in the Years 1835 to 1839.

Gallery

See also 
 Sefaretname

References 

Books about the Ottoman Empire
Memoirs
Letter writers
Travel books